The Frontbench of John Curtin was the federal Australian Labor Party frontbench from 1 October 1935 until Curtin's death on 5 July 1945. It was opposed by the UAP-Country Coalition.

John Curtin became Leader of the Opposition upon his election as leader of the Australian Labor Party on 1 October 1935. His frontbench subsequently formed the Australian Government from 1941 until his death.

Caucus Executive

1935-1937
The following were members of the ALP Caucus Executive from 1 October 1935 to 29 October 1937:
 John Curtin  - Leader of the Opposition and Leader of the Labor Party
 Hon. Frank Forde  - Deputy Leader of the Opposition and Deputy Leader of the Labor Party
 Senator Joe Collings - Leader of the Opposition in the Senate
 Senator Gordon Brown - Deputy Leader of the Opposition in the Senate
 Hon Norman Makin  - Secretary
 Hon Jack Holloway 
 Darby Riordan  (to 15 October 1936)

1937-1940
The following were members of the ALP Caucus Executive from 9 October 1937 to 14 October 1940:
 John Curtin  - Leader of the Opposition and Leader of the Labor Party
 Hon. Frank Forde  - Deputy Leader of the Opposition and Deputy Leader of the Labor Party
 Senator Joe Collings - Leader of the Opposition in the Senate
 Senator Gordon Brown - Deputy Leader of the Opposition in the Senate (to 20 September 1938)
 Senator Richard Keane - Deputy Leader of the Opposition in the Senate (from 20 September 1938)
 Hon Norman Makin  - Secretary
 Frank Brennan 
 Albert Green  (to 2 October 1940)
 Hon Jack Holloway 
 Bert Lazzarini 
 George Martens 
 Eddie Ward

1940-1941
The following were members of the ALP Caucus Executive from 14 October 1940 to 7 October 1941:
 John Curtin  - Leader of the Opposition and Leader of the Labor Party
 Hon. Frank Forde  - Deputy Leader of the Opposition and Deputy Leader of the Labor Party
 Senator Joe Collings - Leader of the Opposition in the Senate
 Senator James Cunningham - Deputy Leader of the Opposition in the Senate
 Hon Norman Makin  - Secretary
 Hon. Ben Chifley 
 Charles Frost 
 Arthur Drakeford 
 Dr H. V. Evatt  
 Hon Jack Holloway 
 Bert Lazzarini

First ministry (1941-1943)

Second ministry (1943-1945)

See also
 Frontbench of James Scullin
 Frontbench of Ben Chifley
 Third Lyons Ministry
 Fourth Lyons Ministry
 Page Ministry
 First Menzies Ministry
 Second Menzies Ministry
 Third Menzies Ministry
 Fadden Ministry

References

Australian Labor Party
Curtin
Opposition of Australia